Kuthalam taluk is a taluk in the Mayiladuthurai District  in the state of Tamil Nadu, India. The administrative headquarters is the town of Kuthalam.

Demographics
According to the 2011 census, the taluk of Kuthalam had a population of 131,927 with 64,874  males and 67,053 females. There were 1034 women for every 1000 men. The taluk had a literacy rate of 75.78. Child population in the age group below 6 was 6,401 Males and 6,316 Females.

References

Taluks of Mayiladuthurai district